The Nagybánya artists' colony was an art colony in Nagybánya, a town in eastern Hungary that became Baia Mare in Romania after World War I. The colony started as a summer retreat for artists, mainly painters from Simon Hollósy's szabadiskola (Free School) in Munich. The original group focused on plein-air painting.

It was Hollósy's idea to have a summer school in a small town. Fellow artists Károly Ferenczy, Béla Iványi-Grünwald, István Réti and János Thorma were involved with the founding of the artists' colony. The colony attracted many artists from Hungary interested in learning the plein-air style taught by Hollósy in the bright atmosphere of Nagybánya. The colony held its first exhibition in 1897 at the Műcsarnok It was well received by some critics as reflecting the new style of European painting, and ridiculed by other critics. Through the course of its existence the teachers and students worked in the emerging modern styles such as Expressionism, Fauvism, Cubism, and Symbolism. Some styles were adopted and some rejected, along with the allegiance of various artists.

Hollósy influence at the colony was overtaken by the style of Károly Ferenczy. Hollósy departed around 1901 to open another school in Técső, Kingdom of Hungary (now western Ukraine).  The colony in Nagybánya continued under the administration of the four remaining founders and renamed the Ingyenes festőiskola (Free Painting School). In 1910 founder Grünwald left to run the Kecskemét Artist's Colony in Kecskemét, Hungary. In the 1910s attendance at Nagybánya continued but lagged  due to World War I and the difficulty of travel.

In 1927, the school was handed over to a new generation of painters and renamed Szépművészeti Iskola (School of Fine Arts). In 1935 the school property and colony was taken over by the town as part of the rise of the fascist Iron Guard. In 1937 the group dissolved. The property was used as a barracks for a time and attempts to revive the property as an art school were unsuccessful.

In 1966 the Hungarian National Gallery had retrospective titled The Art of Nagybánya. Centennial Exhibition in Celebration of the Artists' Colony in Nagybánya.

Associated artists

 Ervin Baktay (Amrita Sher-Gil, uncle)
 Mikola András
 Samu Börtsök
 Géza Bornemisza
 Zoltán Csáktornyai
 Antónia Csíkos
 István Csók
 Viktor Erdei
 József Faragó
 Károly Ferenczy
 Valér Ferenczy
 Béni Ferenczy
 Noémi Ferenczy
 Sándor Galimberti
 Oszkár Glatz
 Béla Iványi-Grünwald
 Simon Hollósy
 Béla Horthy
 Réti István
 Zoltán Jakab
 Iván Komoróczy
 János Krizsán
 Alexander Kubínyi
 Jenő Maticska
 Sándor Nyilasy
 Vilmos Perlrott-Csaba
 Péter Rátz
 Károly Réthy
 János Thorma
 Ernő Béli Vörös
 Sándor Ziffer

Gallery

References

External links

Romanian art
Hungarian art
Baia Mare
Artist colonies
1896 establishments in Hungary
1937 disestablishments in Romania